Milton railway station is a disused railway station in Staffordshire, England.

The Stoke–Leek line was opened by the North Staffordshire Railway (NSR) in 1867. Situated on the single track section of the line between Milton Junction (where the line diverged from the Biddulph Valley line) and Endon, the station had only a single platform.

Passenger services over the line were withdrawn in 1956 and the station closed. The line through the station continued in use until 1988 for freight services and since 1988 the line has officially been out of use but not closed.

References
Notes

Sources
 
 

Disused railway stations in Stoke-on-Trent
Former North Staffordshire Railway stations
Railway stations in Great Britain closed in 1956
Railway stations in Great Britain opened in 1867